Velvet is a cassette EP by the Toadies.  It was self-released on June 26, 1992 on an IEC Type II compact cassette tape.  All songs by Todd Lewis except "Stop It" by Pylon.  All songs recorded live at Crystal Clear Sound except "I Burn", which was recorded on Darrel Herbert's 4-track.  Mastered/engineered by Keith Rust.  Mixed by Keith & T.L.  Cover art by Dan Lightner.  Cover design by Caren Lane.

The songs "Possum Kingdom" and "Got A Heart" also appear in identical form on the Pleather EP.  "Mister Love" can be found in identical form on the "Mister Love" 7" single.  While the song "I Burn" can be found elsewhere, the track as presented here is an acoustic version exclusive to this release.

Track listing
 "Mister Love" (Lewis) - 2:32
 "Run-In with Dad" (Lewis) - 2:00
 "Velvet" (Lewis) - 2:24
 "Possum Kingdom" (Lewis) - 4:56
 "Stop It" (Pylon: Bewley/Briscoe/Crowe/Lachowski) - 2:49
 "I Burn" (Lewis) - 3:24
 "Got A Heart" (Lewis) - 3:13

Repeats both sides.
©1992 Slaphead Tunes.

Personnel
Todd Lewis - vocals, guitar
Lisa Umbarger - bass
Mark Reznicek - drums
Tracey Sauerwein - guitar
Charles Mooney III - guitar

References
Toadies. Velvet. Self-released, 1992. Cassette.
Toadies+Slowpoke. "Toadies tape release, Friday, June 26th at Mad Hatter's, 9:00 show..." Concert flyer, 1992. Facsimile.
Toadies. Pleather. Grass, 1993. CD.
Toadies. "Mister Love". Grass, 1993. 7" single.

1992 EPs
Toadies albums